Kaniasso is a town in north-western Ivory Coast. It is a sub-prefecture of and the seat of Kaniasso Department in Folon Region, Denguélé District. Kaniasso is also a commune.

In 2014, the population of the sub-prefecture of Kaniasso was 13,600.

Villages
The 13 villages of the sub-prefecture of Kaniasso and their population in 2014 are:

References

Sub-prefectures of Folon Region
Communes of Folon Region